Epipremnum meeboldii is a species of flowering plant in the genus Epipremnum and the family Araceae. 

It is native to the Indian state of Assam (Manipur).

References

meeboldii